The 1924 Navy Midshipmen football team represented the United States Naval Academy during the 1924 college football season. In their fifth season under head coach Bob Folwell, the Midshipmen compiled a 2–6 record and outscored opponents by a combined score of 84 to 69.

The annual Army–Navy Game was played on November 29 in Baltimore, Maryland; Army  The Midshipmen defeated Vermont  but were outscored  in their other seven games.

Schedule

References

Navy
Navy Midshipmen football seasons
Navy Midshipmen football